"The Aviator" is the 1965 English translation of a short story, L'Aviateur,  by the French aristocrat writer, poet and pioneering aviator, Antoine de Saint-Exupéry (29 June 1900 – 31 July 1944, Mort pour la France).

The original story (L'Aviateur) upon which the translation was based was Saint-Exupéry's first published work. L'Aviateur was excerpted from a longer unpublished manuscript, L'Évasion de Jacques Bernis (The Escape of Jacques Bernis). L'Aviateur was released in April 1926 in its excerpted form by editor Jean Prévost. It was published by Adrienne Monnier in the eleventh issue of the short-lived French literary magazine Le Navire d'Argent (The Silver Ship), after Saint-Exupéry rewrote L'Évasion de Jacques Bernis from memory, having lost his original manuscript.

Saint-Exupéry was killed during the Second World War while flying with the Free French Air Force. The work's editor, Jean Prévost, was killed only one day after Saint-Exupéry, while serving in the French Resistance.

The Aviator appears as the first chapter in the Saint-Exupéry anthology, Un Sens à la Vie (A Sense of Life). The original French compilation was published posthumously in 1956 by Editions Gallimard, and translated into English by Adrienne Foulke. The story recounts various episodes in the life of the fictional French flyer, Jacques Bernis, from his early experiences as an aviator to his work as a flying instructor, to his last flight when the wing of his monoplane shatters during an aerobatic maneuver.  The work is an example of Saint-Exupéry's formative writing style which would evolve into the more evocative, winning form he would later become famous for.

In his short work the author uses picturesque metaphors, for example comparing the propeller wash flowing backwards like a river in his description of the movements of the grass behind an airplane: "Battue par le vent de l'hélice, l'herbe jusqu'à vingt mètres en arrière semble couler", as well as his descriptions of the physical sensation of the air becoming solid: "Il regarde le capot noir appuyé sur le ciel".

In a short foreword to the story, Jean Prévost wrote: "I met [Saint-Exupéry] at the home of friends and greatly admired his vigor and finesse in describing his impressions as a pilot.... He has a gift for directness and truth that seems to me amazing in a beginning writer".

References 

 Footnotes

 Citations

 Bibliography

 Commire, Anne; Gale Research Company. Something about the Author (Volume 20 of Something about the Author: Facts and Pictures about Contemporary Authors and Illustrators of Books for Young People), Gale Research, 1980,  
 Saint-Exupéry, Antoine; Foulke, Adrienne (trans.) (1965) A Sense of Life, Funk & Wagnalls, 1956. Library of Congress Catalogue Card Number 65-15319
 
 Severson, Marilyn S. (2004). "Masterpieces of French Literature: Greenwood Introduces Literary Masterpieces", Greenwood Publishing Group, .

Works by Antoine de Saint-Exupéry
1926 short stories
French short stories
Short stories about aviation
Works originally published in French magazines
Works originally published in literary magazines